Castillo Point is an ice-covered headland which marks the east side of the terminus of Land Glacier on the coast of Marie Byrd Land. It was mapped by the United States Geological Survey from surveys and from U.S. Navy aerial photographs, 1959–65, and named by the Advisory Committee on Antarctic Names for Rudy Castillo, aerographer, U.S. Navy, with the Marie Byrd Land Survey party and at Hallett Station, respectively, during Operation Deep Freeze 1968 and 1969.

References
 

Headlands of Marie Byrd Land